Lieutenant Colonel John Charles Rea (21 December 1868–1944) was a Welsh footballer who played in the Football League for West Bromwich Albion, and earned nine caps for the Wales national team.

Club career 
Rea's only game for West Bromwich Albion was on 15 December 1894 in a 3–2 win against Stoke.

International career 
Rea made his international debut for Wales on 24 February 1894 in the 1893–94 British Home Championship against Ireland, which finished as a 4–1 home win. He earned nine caps in total for Wales and scored one goal, with his last appearance coming on 19 February 1898 in the 1897–98 British Home Championship against Ireland, which finished as a 0–1 home loss.

Military career 
In 1902, Rea was a Lieutenant in the Royal Garrison Artillery (Volunteers), though volunteer units were reorganised in 1908 with the creation of the Territorial Force. One of the new units formed was the 2nd Welsh Brigade of the Royal Field Artillery, with one battery of the new field artillery brigade provided by the 1st Cardigan Royal Garrison Artillery (Volunteers), becoming the Cardiganshire Battery. Rea served as the commanding officer of the battery by 1912. In August 1914, after World War I was declared, Rea took up his duty of battery commander within the first line division of the Welsh Division, later renamed the 53rd (Welsh) Infantry Division. The divisional artillery were ordered to France to join the British Expeditionary Force, where he arrived in November 1915. The divisional artillery rejoined the rest of the division in Egypt in January 1916, later serving in Palestine. Rea survived the war, and returned to his family business. In 1922, he received the 1914–15 Star, British War Medal and Victory Medal at Terrace Road, Aberystwyth.

Awards 

 1914–15 Star
 British War Medal
 Victory Medal

Personal life 
Rea was born on 21 December 1868 in Lledrod, to John Rea of Worcester and Mary Anne Williams of Newtown. In 1906, he took over the licence and lease for the family's hotel, and converted it to a restaurant with a grocery store. He married Florence Isabel Elkes in 1908 in Birkenhead, and had three children by 1911. Rea lived in Aberystwyth with his wife, who died in 1936. In 1944, he died in Aberystwyth at the age of 75.

Career statistics

International

References 

1868 births
1944 deaths
Footballers from Aberystwyth
Welsh footballers
Wales international footballers
English Football League players
Association football forwards
London Caledonians F.C. players
London Welsh F.C. players
Aberystwyth Town F.C. players
West Bromwich Albion F.C. players
British Army personnel of World War I
Welsh people of World War I
Royal Field Artillery officers